The 1990–91 New Jersey Nets season was the Nets' 24th season in the National Basketball Association, and 15th season in East Rutherford, New Jersey. After finishing with the worst record last season, the Nets won the draft lottery, and selected Derrick Coleman out of Syracuse University with the first overall pick in the 1990 NBA draft. In the off-season, the team acquired Reggie Theus from the Orlando Magic. However, the Nets continued to struggle losing eleven consecutive games between December and January. Their movement would continue at mid-season as they acquired Dražen Petrović from the Portland Trail Blazers, and rookie forward Terry Mills from the Denver Nuggets. The Nets finished fifth in the Atlantic Division with a 26–56 record. Coleman had a stellar rookie season averaging 18.4 points and 10.3 rebounds per game, as he was named Rookie of the Year. Following the season, Theus retired.

For the season, the Nets changed their primary logo, and added new uniforms, plus adding light blue road jerseys. The logo and home uniforms lasted until 1997, while the road jerseys only lasted for just one season, where they changed them to a darker blue color next season.

Draft picks

Roster

Regular season

Season standings

y – clinched division title
x – clinched playoff spot

z – clinched division title
y – clinched division title
x – clinched playoff spot

Record vs. opponents

Schedule

Player statistics

Regular season

Player Statistics Citation:

Awards, Records and Honors
 Derrick Coleman, NBA Rookie of the Year Award
 Derrick Coleman, NBA All-Rookie Team 1st Team

Transactions

References

 New Jersey Nets on Database Basketball
 New Jersey Nets on Basketball Reference

New Jersey Nets season
New Jersey Nets seasons
New Jersey Nets
New Jersey Nets
20th century in East Rutherford, New Jersey
Meadowlands Sports Complex